Hell Below Zero is a 1954 British-American adventure film directed by Mark Robson and starring Alan Ladd, Joan Tetzel, Basil Sydney and Stanley Baker. It was written by Alec Coppel and Max Trell based on the 1949 novel The White South by Hammond Innes, and presents interesting footage of whaling fleets in action. It was the second of Ladd's films for Warwick Films.

Plot
Captain Nordahl, an associate in a Norwegian whaling company, Bland-Nordahl, is on a factory ship Southern Harvester in Antarctic waters, when he is lost overboard.

Duncan Craig, an American, meets Judie Nordahl, the captain's daughter on his way to South Africa, where he gets even with a business partner who cheated him. With little money left and a desire to see Judie again, Craig signs on to be a mate on the ship taking Judie to Antarctica.

On arrival in Antarctic waters, Craig finds suspicious evidence that seems to implicate skipper Erik Bland, the new captain of the factory ship, in a conspiracy. Another murder follows and the film concludes with a dramatic showdown on the ice.

Cast

 Alan Ladd as Duncan Craig
 Joan Tetzel as Judie Nordhal
 Basil Sydney as Bland
 Stanley Baker as Erik Bland
 Joseph Tomelty as Capt. McPhee
 Niall MacGinnis as Dr. Howe
 Jill Bennett as Gerda Petersen
 Peter Dyneley as Miller
 Susan Rayne as Kathleen
 Philo Hauser as Sandeborg
 Ivan Craig as Larsen
 Paddy Ryan as Manders
 Cyril Chamberlain as Factory Ship Radio Operator
 Paul Homer as Kista Dan Radio Operator
 Edward Hardwicke as Ulvik
 John Witty as Martens
 Brandon Toomey as Christiansen
 Genine Graham as Stewardess
 Basil Cunard as Office Manager
 Fred Griffiths as Drunken Sailor
 John Warren as Hotel Receptionist
 Philip Ray as Capt. Petersen
 Paul Connell as Svensen
 Glyn Houston as Borg

Production
The movie was part of a two-picture deal Ladd made with Warwick Films, following The Red Beret. Ladd was paid $200,000 against 10% of the profits. During production it was known as White South and White Mantle. Director Mark Robson wanted Eugene Pallette to play a role but Pallette was unhappy with the size of the part in the script.

Shooting took place at Pinewood Studios near London. The film included location footage shot in Antarctic waters. Albert Broccoli accompanied a second unit crew down there for over three months. The film's sets were designed by the art director Alex Vetchinsky.

Reception
According to Kinematograph Weekly the film was a "money maker" at the British box office in 1954.

References

External links
 
 
 
 

1954 films
British adventure films
1954 adventure films
Columbia Pictures films
Films about whaling
Films based on British novels
Films based on works by Hammond Innes
Films directed by Mark Robson
Films scored by Clifton Parker
Films shot at Pinewood Studios
Films set in Antarctica
Films with screenplays by Richard Maibaum
1950s English-language films
American adventure films
1950s American films
1950s British films